Yellowstone National Park has over  of blazed and mapped hiking trails, including some that have been in use for hundreds of years.  Several of these trails were the sites of historical events.  Yellowstone's trails are noted for various geysers, hot springs, and other geothermal features, and for viewing of bald eagles, ospreys, grizzly bears, black bears, wolves, coyotes, bighorn sheep, pronghorns, and free-ranging herds of bison and elk.

Prehistoric times 

In the Middle Prehistoric era, humans appear to have continued living in mountain areas through droughts severe enough for plains populations to disappear.  Evidence suggests that the Yellowstone Plateau was occupied continuously, with seasonal movement among preferred places.  Foragers wintered in protected valleys along the edges of the plateau, and summered in higher hunting grounds that might have extended fifty to a hundred miles away.  Some of the seasonal routes developed into often-used trails.  Artifacts from this era are found throughout the park, with large enough concentrations around Yellowstone Lake to suggest a substantial population.

Early 1800s

First white discoverer used Indian trail sections 

John Colter (or Coulter), a former member of the Lewis and Clark Expedition, spent the winter of 1806-1807 trapping along the middle Yellowstone River.  With the information he learned there, he was hired by the Missouri Fur Trading Company to invite Indian tribes to the trading post the company built at the mouth of the Big Horn River in October 1807.  In the winter of 1807-1808, soliciting trade with the Crow and other native tribes, Colter traveled alone on a  route that included the Yellowstone Plateau, making him the first white man to see Yellowstone Lake and some of the area's unique features.  Colter's route included Indian trails both inside and outside the current park, such as over Pryor Gap near Cody, Wyoming; around the west shore of Yellowstone Lake and down Yellowstone River to the crossing near Tower Fall (a geothermal area on the east bank is "Hot Spring Brimstone" on Clark's map); and continuing up Lamar River and Soda Butte Creek and Clarks Fork to return to the Pryor Gap trail.

Bannock Trail 

By 1840, bison (buffalo) had been hunted and trapped to extirpation west of the Continental Divide.  The Shoshone and Bannock tribes had established a plains-style culture based on the buffalo on the Snake River plains, but the regional extirpation forced them to organize hunting migrations across the Yellowstone Plateau.  These tribes established a route that became known as the Bannock Trail.  The route began at Camas Meadows in Idaho, went over Targhee Pass, followed the Madison River basin, went over the Gallatin Mountains near Mount Holmes, down Indian Creek to the Gardner River, through Snow Pass to Mammoth Hot Springs, up Lava Creek, through the meadows of Blacktail Deer Creek, to the "Bannock Ford" crossing of the Yellowstone River near Tower Fall, up the Lamar Valley, and over the Absaroka Range into the Clarks Fork Valley.  From there, Bannock and Shoshone (often with Flathead and Nez Perce) would choose between the Yellowstone Valley and the Wyoming Basin to hunt bison.  For forty years ending in 1878 with the Bannock War, tribes used the Bannock Trail for access to drainages such as the Madison, Gallatin, Yellowstone, Stillwater, Clarks Fork, and Shoshone valleys, and through them to a more distant arc of buffalo ranges.

Folsom party used Indian trails 

The most organized of the numerous explorations into Yellowstone in the 1860s was the 1869 Cook–Folsom–Peterson Expedition.  It was particularly well documented as having traveled on existing Indian trails.  From the Bozeman Pass area, the three-man group rode on a former Indian trail up Meadow Creek from the Gallatin drainage to the Yellowstone drainage, and down Trail Creek (named for its old trail) to the Yellowstone Valley, as miners had done since 1864.  They followed Indian trails up the Yellowstone River the rest of the way south to the mouth of the Gardner River, where the trail forked.  The party used the fork over Blacktail Deer Creek Plateau to the head of Rescue Creek.  Portions of their later travels used other trails long used by natives.  An article by Charles W. Cook and David E. Folsom describing the expedition was published in a Chicago magazine in 1870, raising popular attention.  David Folsom worked with Walter W. deLacy, another explorer of Yellowstone, to revise deLacy's 1865 map; the 1870 edition aided that year's Washburn-Langford-Doane Expedition.  They followed the same route into the area as far as Rescue Creek, then used the Bannock Trail eastward.  Like the Folsom party, Washburn's group used other Indian trails around parts of Yellowstone Lake and elsewhere in the future Park.

First years as a national park 

Yellowstone's first superintendent, Nathaniel P. Langford, served without salary from 1872 to 1877.  He also worked without funds, and entered the park only twice in his five years of service.  Under Langford, no trails were developed, and existing trails were maintained only by their users and guides.

Trail development by P.W. Norris 

Yellowstone's second superintendent, Philetus W. Norris, served from 1877 to 1882. His administration, unlike Langford's, had a budget for roadbuilding and trailbuilding.

Superintendent Norris added the trail (later a road) east through Lamar Valley and out the park's northeast corner, in 1878.  He discovered, explored, and cleared a trail over the Washburn Range through Rowland Pass, in 1878.

Current trail system 

Many trails in Yellowstone traverse Bear Management Areas and are seasonally closed or restricted to reduce human contact with bears.

Interpretive and attraction related trails
These trails are primarily associated with park attractions, especially geothermal features, and are sometimes out and back day hikes, and in many cases are improved boardwalks and supported with interpretive signs and exhibits.

Backcountry trails
These trails traverse the Yellowstone backcountry and many have backcountry campsites along their route.

Notes

References

Further reading

Yellowstone National Park
Hiking trails in Montana
Hiking trails in Wyoming